Swan Point Cemetery is a historic rural cemetery located in Providence, Rhode Island, United States. Established in 1846 on a 60-acre (0.24 km2) plot of land, it has approximately 40,000 interments.

History 

The cemetery was first organized under the Swan Point Cemetery Company, with a board of trustees. In 1858, a new charter was developed to make the cemetery administration non-profit, and it was taken over by a group known as the Proprietors of Swan Point Cemetery. In 1886, landscape architect H.W.S. Cleveland was hired to redesign the area.  It is a cemetery park with its design inspired by the landscape architect Frederick Law Olmsted's Mount Auburn Cemetery in Cambridge, Massachusetts.

Among the first to make use of a tract of land within the cemetery was the First Congregational Society (now First Unitarian Society). They moved several interments from older plots in Providence to Swan Point.

The Swan Point Cemetery is widely considered to be the most prominent cemetery in Rhode Island due to the number of well known citizens of the state buried there.  There are more governors, senators and congressmen buried there than any other cemetery in Rhode Island.

Swan Point Cemetery was listed on the National Register of Historic Places in 1977.  It is one of the two largest cemeteries in Providence with the other one being the North Burial Ground.

Notable interments 

Swan Point has the burials of many notable Rhode Island figures:
 Rachel Blodgett Adams, 1921 Ph.D., mathematician
 David Aldrich, American artist
 Nelson W. Aldrich, U.S. Congressman, U.S. Senator, grandfather of Vice President Nelson Rockefeller
 Richard Steere Aldrich, U.S. Congressman, son of Nelson W. Aldrich
 Henry B. Anthony, Governor of Rhode Island, and President pro tempore of the U.S. Senate
 Lemuel H. Arnold, U.S. Congressman, Governor of Rhode Island
 Richard Arnold, Union army general
 Sullivan Ballou, state politician, Civil War officer killed in action at the Battle of Bull Run, whose love letter to his wife was featured in Ken Burns's The Civil War
 David L. Barnes, U.S. District judge, litigant in West v. Barnes
 Bathsheba A. Benedict, (1809–1897), abolitionist and philanthropist, and benefactor of Benedict College
 Augustus Osborn Bourn (1834–1925), Businessman and politician, Governor of Rhode Island 1883–1885
 Charles R. Brayton, Civil War officer, Postmaster of Providence and long time Republican political boss
 Ambrose Burnside, Major General in the Civil War, Governor of Rhode Island and U.S. Senator
 Adin Ballou Capron, U.S. Congressman
 Malcolm Greene Chace (1875–1955), industrialist, hockey innovator, and amateur tennis player
 Malcolm Greene Chace Jr., (1904–1996) chairman of Berkshire Hathaway during the 1960s
 Malcolm Greene Chace III (1934–2011), board of directors of Berkshire Hathaway 1992–2007
 George Henry Corliss, inventor of the Corliss steam engine
 Helen Metcalf Danforth (1887–1984) university president.
 Jane Anthony Davis, American painter
 Thomas Davis, U.S. Congressman
 Thomas Wilson Dorr, Political reformer, revolutionary and Governor of Rhode Island 
 Sarah Elizabeth Doyle, Educator and reformer.
 Thomas Arthur Doyle, long-serving mayor of Providence
 Elisha Dyer, Governor of Rhode Island
 Elisha Dyer Jr., Governor of Rhode Island, Mayor of Providence
 Benjamin Tucker Eames, U.S. Congressman
 C. M. Eddy Jr., author
 Theodore Foster, U.S. Senator
 Albert Gallup, U.S. Congressman
 Lucius F. C. Garvin, Governor of Rhode Island
 Darius Goff, Pawtucket businessman and textile mill owner.
 Daniel L. D. Granger, U.S. Congressman
 Theodore F. Green, Governor of Rhode Island and U.S. Senator 
 William S. Hayward, Mayor of Providence
 Robert Henri, American painter and teacher
 William Warner Hoppin, Governor of Rhode Island
 Charles Tillinghast James, U.S. Senator
 Thomas Allen Jenckes, U.S. Congressman
 William Jones, Governor of Rhode Island
 Herbert W. Ladd, Governor of Rhode Island
 Benedict Lapham, industrialist, philanthropist
 Oscar Lapham, U.S. Congressman
 Charles W. Lippitt, Governor of Rhode Island 
 Frederick Lippitt, Philanthropist
 Henry Lippitt, Governor of Rhode Island 
 Henry Frederick Lippitt, U.S. Senator
 Alfred Henry Littlefield, Governor of Rhode Island
 H. P. Lovecraft, American author
 Helen Adelia Rowe Metcalf (1830–1895), founder and director of a university.
 Jesse Houghton Metcalf, U.S. Senator
 Seth Padelford, Governor of Rhode Island
 Charles H. Page, U.S. Congressman
 Vahram Papazyan, Olympic runner
 Whipple Van Buren Phillips, businessman
 Eliza Greene Metcalf Radeke (1854–1931), university president.
 D.W. Reeves (1838–1900), bandleader known as "father of band music in America"
 Elisha Hunt Rhodes, Union Civil War veteran featured prominently in Ken Burns's The Civil War
 Horatio Rogers Jr., Attorney General of Rhode Island and Rhode Island Supreme Court Justice
 James Y. Smith, Mayor of Providence and Governor of Rhode Island
 William Sprague III, Governor of Rhode Island and U.S. Senator
 William Sprague IV, Governor of Rhode Island and U.S. Senator
 Alfred Stone, Providence architect
 Royal C. Taft, Governor of Rhode Island
 George William Whitaker (1840–1916), the "Dean of Providence Painters"

See also
 National Register of Historic Places listings in Providence, Rhode Island
 List of cemeteries in Rhode Island

References

External links 

 Swan Point Cemetery official website
 
 

Buildings and structures in Providence, Rhode Island
Cemeteries in Rhode Island
Cemeteries on the National Register of Historic Places in Rhode Island
Protected areas of Providence County, Rhode Island
Tourist attractions in Providence, Rhode Island
1846 establishments in Rhode Island
National Register of Historic Places in Providence, Rhode Island
Rural cemeteries